Konrad Lex  (born 7 December 1974 in Eggenfelden, Lower Bavaria) is a German ski mountaineer. He is a member of the DAV section Gangkofen and of the national team.

Lex studied at Munich University of Applied Sciences.

Selected results 
 2005:
 9th, Dammkarwurm
 2006:
 7th, German Championship single
 9th, Mountain Attack race
 2007:
 1st, German Championship single
 3rd, German Championship vertical race
 4th, European Championship relay race (together with Toni Steurer, Martin Echtler and Stefan Klinger)
 2008:
 2nd, German Championship single
 3rd, German Championship vertical race
 6th, World Championship relay race (together with Toni Steurer, Andreas Strobel and Stefan Klinger)
 2009:
 1st, German Championship vertical race
 3rd, Mountain Attack race
 9th, European Championship relay race (together with Toni Steurer, Andreas Strobel and Alexander Schuster)
 2010:
 9th, World Championship relay race (together with Martin Echtler, Andreas Strobel and Alexander Schuster)
 1st, Mountain Attack race
 2011:
 6th, World Championship relay, together with Philipp Reiter, Anton Palzer and Toni Steurer
 1st, German Championship vertical race

Patrouille des Glaciers 

 2010: 9th ("ISMF men" ranking), together with Martin Echtler and Josef Rottmoser

External links 
 Konrad Lex at skimountaineering.com

References 

1974 births
Living people
People from Eggenfelden
Sportspeople from Lower Bavaria
German male ski mountaineers